Walkers is a British snack food manufacturer mainly operating in the UK and Ireland. The company is best known for manufacturing potato crisps and other (non-potato-based) snack foods. In 2013, it held 56% of the British crisp market. Walkers was founded in 1948 in Leicester, England, by Henry Walker. In 1989, Walkers was acquired by Lay's owner, Frito-Lay, a division of PepsiCo.

The Walkers factory in Leicester produces over 11 million bags of crisps per day, using about 800 tons of potatoes. According to the BBC television programme Inside the Factory, production of a bag of crisps takes approximately 35 minutes from the moment the raw potatoes are delivered to the factory, to the point at which finished product leaves the dispatch bay for delivery to customers. The company produces a variety of flavours for its crisps. The three main varieties are: Cheese and Onion (introduced in 1954), Salt and Vinegar (introduced in 1967) and Ready Salted. Other varieties include: Worcester Sauce, Roast Chicken, Prawn Cocktail, Smoky Bacon, Tomato Ketchup, and Pickled Onion.

The Leicester-born former England international footballer Gary Lineker has been the face of the brand since 1995, featuring in most of its popular commercials and successful advertising campaigns. For the 2011 Comic Relief, four celebrities each represented four new flavours. The Walkers brand (under PepsiCo) sponsors the UEFA Champions League and the Super Cup for the UK and Irish markets. In 2019, Walkers reunited with the Spice Girls, with the 1990s girl band featuring in a campaign.

Since 2008, Walkers has run its "Do Us a Flavour" campaign, challenging the British public to think up unique flavours for its crisps. Six flavours were chosen from among the entries and released as special editions. Consumers could vote on their favourite, and the winner would become a permanent flavour. In 2018, Walkers launched six new flavours to celebrate the brand's seventieth birthday, with each flavour representing a different decade.

History
In the 1880s, Walker moved from Mansfield, Nottinghamshire to Leicester to take over an established butcher's shop in the high street. Meat rationing in the UK after World War II saw the factory output drop dramatically, and so in 1948 the company starting looking at alternative products. Potato crisps were becoming increasingly popular with the public; this led managing director R.E. Gerrard to shift the company focus and begin hand-slicing and frying potatoes.

Prior to the 1950s crisps were sold without flavour; Smith's of London sold plain potato crisps which came with a small blue sachet of salt that could be sprinkled over them. The first crisps manufactured by Walkers in 1948 were sprinkled with salt and sold for threepence a bag. After Archer Martin and Richard Synge (while working in Leeds) received a Nobel Prize for the invention of partition chromatography in 1952, food scientists began to develop flavours via a gas chromatograph, a device that allowed scientists to understand chemical compounds behind complex flavours such as cheese. In 1954, the first flavoured crisps were invented by Joe “Spud” Murphy (owner of the Irish company Tayto) who developed a technique to add cheese and onion seasoning during production. Later that year, Walkers introduced Cheese and Onion (inspired by the Ploughman's lunch), and Salt and Vinegar was launched in 1967 (inspired by the nation's love of fish and chips). Prawn Cocktail flavour was introduced in the 1970s (inspired by the 1970s popular starter of prawn cocktail) and Roast Chicken (inspired by the nation's roast dinner). In 1989, the company was acquired by PepsiCo, which placed operations under its Frito-Lay unit.

The Walkers logo, featuring a red ribbon around a yellow sun, is noticeably similar to Lay's.  It derives from the Walkers logo used in 1990. The company is still a significant presence in Leicester. Gary Lineker, the Leicester-born former footballer, is now the face of the company. In 2000, Lineker's Walkers commercials were ranked ninth in Channel 4’s UK wide poll of "The 100 Greatest TV Ads". The official website states that an estimated "11 million people will eat a Walkers product every day". The company employs over 4,000 people in 15 locations around the UK.

In June 1999, PepsiCo transferred ownership of its Walkers brands out of Britain and into a Swiss subsidiary, Frito-Lay Trading GmbH. Subsequently, according to The Guardian, the "UK tax authorities managed to claw back less than a third of what they might" have received had an unchanged structure continued producing the same sort of level of UK profits and tax as Walkers Snack Foods had in 1998. In September 2001, Walkers ran a "Moneybags" promotion where £20, £10 and £5 notes were placed in special winning bags. However, two workers at a crisp factory were sacked after stealing cash prizes from bags on the production line.

In February 2006, Walkers changed its brand label and typeset. It also announced it would reduce the saturated fat in its crisps by 70%. It started frying its crisps in "SunSeed" oil, as claiming the oil is higher in monounsaturated fat content than the standard sunflower oil which it had used previously, establishing its own sunflower farms in Ukraine and Spain to be able to produce sufficient quantities of the oil. Walkers updated its packaging style in June 2007, moving to a brand identity reminiscent of the logo used from 1998 to 2006.

Many of Walkers brands were formerly branded under the Smiths Crisps name. This comes from the time when Walkers, Smiths and Tudor Crisps were the three main brands of Nabisco's UK snack division, with Tudor being marketed mainly in the north of England and Smiths in the south. After the takeover by PepsiCo, the Tudor name was dropped, and the Smiths brand has become secondary to Walkers. The only products retaining the Smiths brand are Salt & Vinegar and Ready Salted Chipsticks, Frazzles and the "Savoury Selection", which includes Bacon Flavour Fries, Scampi Flavour Fries and Cheese Flavoured Moments. To promote the freshness of its products, Walkers began to package them in foil bags from 1993, then from 1996, began filling them with nitrogen instead of air.

In 1997, Walkers became the brand name of Quavers and Monster Munch snacks. In January 1999, Walkers launched Max, a brand with a range of crisps and then a new-look Quavers in March 1999. In April 2000, another of the Max flavours called Red Hot Max was launched and then Naked Max in June 2000. In February 2000, a new-look Cheetos was relaunched, serving as the only cheesy snack in the UK. In July 2000, the Quavers packaging was updated. In March 2001, Walkers bought Squares, a range of snacks from Smiths. in. November 2001, more Max flavours were introduced. They included chargrilled steak and chip shop curry.

In May 2002, Walkers launched Sensations. Sensations flavours include Thai Sweet Chilli, Roast Chicken & Thyme, Balsamic Vinegar & Caramelised Onion. Walkers introduced the streaky bacon Quavers flavour to salt & vinegar and prawn cocktail in August 2002.

In January 2003, Smiths brands Salt 'n' Shake, Scampi Fries and Bacon Fries were relaunched under the Walkers identity. In January 2003 Walkers bought Wotsits from Golden Wonder, which replaced Cheetos during December 2002. In April 2004, Walkers launched a Flamin' Hot version of Wotsits, which replaced BBQ beef, and then Wotsits Twisted, a range of cheese puffs in July 2004. In September 2007, Walkers launched Sunbites, a healthier range of lower/better fat crisps made using whole grains.

In July 2008, Walkers launched its "Do Us a Flavour" campaign, challenging the public to think up unique flavours for its crisps. In January 2009 six flavours were chosen from among the entries and released as special editions, available until May 2009. During this period, consumers could vote on their favourite, and the winner would become a permanent flavour. The winner was Builder's Breakfast by Emma Rushin from Belper in Derbyshire. This flavour was discontinued a year later, in May 2010, in order for Walkers to focus on the upcoming 'Flavour Cup'.

In summer 2009, Walkers launched its premium "Red Sky" brand of "all natural" potato crisps and snacks. It was stated that Red Sky products were made from 100% natural ingredients, and that the makers "work in partnership with Cool Earth", a charity that protects endangered rainforest; Walkers made charitable donations proportionate to the number of purchases of Red Sky snacks. Walkers discontinued the range in 2014 following poor sales.

In April 2010, the company launched a promotional campaign entitled the Walkers Flavour Cup in order to locate the world's most loved and favourite flavour. In the end, it was decided that the flavour with the most fans at the end of the tournament/competition would be declared the winner and ultimate champion of all flavours. Walkers encouraged people to engage in social media activity, and upload photos and videos to its website proving people's Superfan status of Walkers Crisps. The best fan from each of the 15 flavours won £10,000. In the end, English roast beef & Yorkshire pudding won the Flavour Cup.

For the 2011 Comic Relief, four celebrities (Jimmy Carr, Stephen Fry, Al Murray and Frank Skinner) each represented four new flavours. In early 2013, Walkers revised its packaging, with a new design and typeface. Slogans such as 'Distinctively Salt & Vinegar' and 'Classically Ready Salted' were added to the front of packs. The previous packaging design had only existed for 12 months. Along with this packaging design, there came news that the company would begin using real meat products in its Smoky Bacon and Roast Chicken flavoured crisps. This prompted opposition from vegetarians, vegans, Muslims and Jews, who were now unable to eat these flavours.

In 2014, Lineker launched a new "Do Us a Flavour" Walkers competition which encouraged people to submit new flavours of crisps, with the best six being sold later in the year before a public vote to decide the winner. The winner would win £1m. The public had to pick one of Walkers' ingredients as a base – Somerset Cheddar, Devonshire chicken, Norfolk pork, Dorset sour cream, Vale of Evesham tomatoes and Aberdeen Angus beef – then choose their own unique flavour.

In 2015, Walkers launched the "Bring me Back" campaign, reintroducing Barbecue, Cheese and Chive, Beef and Onion, Lamb and Mint and Toasted Cheese flavours for a limited time. People voted on the Walkers website or used hashtags to see which flavour would be reintroduced permanently (Beef and Onion was chosen). The Marmite flavour was also brought back permanently to coincide with the promotion.

On 10 April 2016, Walkers launched the Spell and Go promotion, again fronted by Gary Lineker. This competition caused some controversy as customers complained that it was impossible to win.  The fairness of the competition was discussed on You and Yours, the consumer show on BBC Radio 4. Over 100 entrants complained to the Advertising Standards Authority, who after completing an investigation, decided that elements were misleading, and the competition was banned.

As of 2018, Walkers came under pressure from campaigners to change its packaging due to its contribution to litter and plastic pollution. As part of the protest a marine biology student wore a crisp packet dress to her graduation. She claimed the dress was inspired by litter she had seen on a beach. In September 2018, the Royal Mail appealed to customers to stop posting empty crisp packets to Walkers, which campaigners had asked people to do and "flood Walkers social media with pictures of us popping them in the post". Royal Mail was obliged by law to deliver the bags to Walkers' freepost address, but without envelopes they could not go through machines and had to be sorted by hand, causing delays.

Product range

Core crisps 

Walkers' most common flavours of regular crisp are Ready Salted (sold in a red packet), Salt & Vinegar (green), Cheese & Onion (blue), Smoky Bacon (maroon) and Prawn Cocktail (pink). Other flavours are sold in other coloured packets, such as Beef & Onion (brown), Marmite (black), and Worcester sauce (purple). The unusual colours for Walkers packaging with Salt & Vinegar (in green, with other brands in blue), and Cheese & Onion (in blue, with other brands in green) has been debated in the UK, with some believing Walkers switched the colours; however, Walkers have stated that they have always had that colour scheme. In 2021, actress Thandiwe Newton joked, "Salt 'n Vinegar is BLUE, and Cheese and Onion is GREEN. Ok? Enough with this foolishness."

Some flavours were made available for a short time either because they tied in with special promotions, or failed to meet sales expectations. Walkers' "Great British Dinner" range included baked ham & mustard and chicken tikka. A series of "mystery flavours" were launched in 2012, and later revealed to be sour cream & spring onion, Lincolnshire sausage & brown sauce, and Birmingham chicken balti. In 2016, Walkers produced a limited edition 'Winners - Salt and Victory' crisps to commemorate its home-town football team, Leicester City, winning the Premier League for the first time. Earlier that season, Walkers had given Leicester fans in attendance at a match versus Chelsea bags of "Vardy salted" crisps, bearing the image of the Foxes' striker.

Other lines

Other Walkers products are:
 Baked crisp range
 Cheese Heads
 Crinkles
 Deep Ridged (now Max Double Crunch)
 Extra Crunchy (150g bags, launched in 2010) 
 Lights (low fat crisps, formerly Lites)
 Market Deli crisps, pitta chips and tortilla chips
 Max
 Pops
 Potato Heads (discontinued in 2008) 
Salt 'n' Shake
 Sensations (a premium range of crisps, poppadums and nuts) 
 Squares
 Stars
 Sunbites (wholegrain crispy snacks)
 Hoops and Crosses 
 Chipsticks
 Doritos
 French Fries
 Frazzles
 Mix-Ups
 Quavers
 Monster Munch
 Sundog Savoury Popcorn
 Snaps
 Twisted
 Wotsits (including the Wafflers variant)

In January 2019, Walkers unveiled new packaging for its main range, celebrating its British heritage through its design. The new packaging features the Walkers logo in the middle of each packet rather than centre-top, alongside a new series of illustrations which are laid out in the shape of a Union Jack flag, and feature icons and landmarks such as London's Big Ben and red telephone boxes, and Liverpool's Liver Building.

Litter
According to the environmental charity Keep Britain Tidy, Walkers crisps packets along with Cadbury chocolate wrappers and Coca-Cola cans were the three top brands that were the most common pieces of rubbish found in UK streets in 2013. In December 2018, Walkers launched a recycling scheme for crisp packets after it was targeted by protests on the issue. Three months after its launch more than half a million empty packets were recycled. However, as UK consumers eat 6 billion packets of crisps per year, with Walkers producing 11 million packets per day, the campaign organisation 38 Degrees noted this represents only a small fraction of the number of packets made and sold annually.

See also 
 List of brand name snack foods

References

External links

Snack food manufacturers of the United Kingdom
Frito-Lay brands
Brand name snack foods
British brands
Manufacturing companies based in Leicester
Products introduced in 1948
Brand name potato chips and crisps
 
1989 mergers and acquisitions